Avis is a borough in Clinton County, Pennsylvania, United States. The population was 1,484 at the 2010 census.

Geography
Avis is located in southeastern Clinton County at  (41.185234, -77.316455). It is on the north side of the valley of the West Branch Susquehanna River, which passes  to the south.

U.S. Route 220, a four-lane freeway, runs along the southern edge of the borough, with access from Exit 118 (Pennsylvania Route 150) to the south of town and from Exit 120 (Pennsylvania Route 44) to the east.

Demographics

As of the census of 2000, there were 1,492 people, 633 households, and 417 families residing in the borough. The racial makeup of the borough was 98.73% White, 0.34% African American, 0.60% Asian, and 0.34% from two or more races. Hispanic or Latino of any race were 0.07% of the population.

There were 633 households, out of which 29.9% had children under the age of 18 living with them, 54.0% were married couples living together, 8.1% had a female householder with no husband present, and 34.0% were non-families. 29.7% of all households were made up of individuals, and 17.4% had someone living alone who was 65 years of age or older. The average household size was 2.35 and the average family size was 2.91.

In the borough the population was spread out, with 23.3% under the age of 18, 8.0% from 18 to 24, 27.3% from 25 to 44, 22.3% from 45 to 64, and 19.2% who were 65 years of age or older. The median age was 40 years. For every 100 females, there were 95.3 males. For every 100 females age 18 and over, there were 91.9 males.

The median income for a household in the borough was $31,083, and the median income for a family was $39,167. Males had a median income of $30,250 versus $18,942 for females. The per capita income for the borough was $16,371. About 6.5% of families and 9.8% of the population were below the poverty line, including 7.6% of those under age 18 and 14.0% of those age 65 or over.

References

Populated places established in 1901
Pennsylvania populated places on the Susquehanna River
Boroughs in Clinton County, Pennsylvania
1908 establishments in Pennsylvania